La Palma de Cervelló is a municipality in the comarca of Baix Llobregat, Barcelona Province, Catalonia, Spain. It is located not far from Barcelona city, close to the Llobregat river.

References

External links

 La Palma de Cervelló Town Hall webpage
 Government data pages 
 Patrimoni històric i artístic de La Palma de Cervelló

Municipalities in Baix Llobregat